Wicked, also known as Condannata in Italy and Malvada in Spain, is a 1931 American pre-Code drama film directed by Allan Dwan and starring Elissa Landi, Victor McLaglen, and Una Merkel. The screenplay concerns a woman who commits murder while trying to save her bandit husband and bears a child in prison. The production dates were between early June and early July 1931.

Cast
Elissa Landi as Margot Rande
Victor McLaglen as Scott Burrows
Una Merkel as June
Irene Rich as Mrs. Luther
Alan Dinehart as Blake
Theodore von Eltz as Rony Rande
Oscar Apfel as Judge Luther
Mae Busch as Arlene
Ruth Donnelly as Fanny
Eileen Percy as Stella
Kathleen Kerrigan as Miss Peck
Alice Lake as Prisoner
William Pawley as Cop
G. Pat Collins as Cop
Clarence Wilson as Juryman
Edwin Maxwell as Owner of property
George Kuwa as Tony's friend
Lloyd Whitlock as Tony's Friend

References

Further reading
 Hall, Mordaunt. The Screen; A Mother in Prison, The New York Times: Amusements, Books Section, September 19, 1931, p. 10

External links
 
 Ovguide.com
 Tcm.com
 Reelzchannel.com - Wicked
 Filmsuggest.com
 Reelzchannel.com - comments

1931 films
1930s prison films
Films directed by Allan Dwan
American black-and-white films
Fox Film films
1930s musical drama films
American musical drama films
Melodrama films
Films with screenplays by Kathryn Scola
1931 drama films
1930s American films